KATK may refer to:

 KATK (AM), a radio station (740 AM) licensed to Carlsbad, New Mexico, United States
 KATK-FM, a radio station (92.1 FM) licensed to Carlsbad, New Mexico, United States